The Dark Ages Radio Explorer (DARE) mission is a proposed concept lunar orbiter intended to identify redshifted emanations from primeval hydrogen atoms just as the first stars began to emit light. DARE will use the precisely redshifted 21-cm transition line from neutral hydrogen (1420.00 MHz emissions) to view and pinpoint the formation of the first illuminations of the universe and the period ending the Dark Ages of the universe. The orbiter will explore the universe as it was from around 80 million years to 420 million years after the Big Bang. The mission will deliver data pertaining to the formation of the first stars, the initial black hole accretions, and the reionization of the universe. Computer models of galaxy formation will also be tested.

This mission might also add to research on dark matter decay. The DARE program will also provide insight for developing and deploying lunar surface telescopes that add to refined exoplanet exploration of nearby stars. It is expected to launch in 2023.

Background
The period after recombination occurred but before stars and galaxies formed is known as the "dark ages". During this time, the majority of matter in the universe is neutral hydrogen. This hydrogen has yet to be observed, but there are experiments underway to detect the hydrogen line produced during this era. The hydrogen line is produced when an electron in a neutral hydrogen atom is excited to a state where the electron and proton have aligned spins, or de-excited as the electron and proton spins go from being aligned to anti-aligned. The energy difference between these two hyperfine states is  electron volts, with a wavelength of 21 centimeters. At times when neutral hydrogen is in thermodynamic equilibrium with the photons in the cosmic microwave background (CMB), the neutral hydrogen and CMB are said to be "coupled", and the hydrogen line is not observable. It is only when the two temperatures differ, or decoupled, that the hydrogen line can be observed.

Theoretical motivation
The Big Bang produced a hot, dense, nearly homogeneous universe. As the universe expanded and cooled, particles, then nuclei, and finally atoms formed. At a redshift of about 1100, equivalent to about 400,000 years after the Big Bang, when the primordial plasma filling the universe cooled sufficiently for protons and electrons to combine into neutral hydrogen atoms, the universe became optically thin whereby photons from this early era no longer interacted with matter. We detect these photons today as the cosmic microwave background (CMB). The CMB shows that the universe was still remarkably smooth and uniform.
 
After the protons and electrons combined to produce the first hydrogen atoms, the universe consisted of a nearly uniform, almost completely neutral, intergalactic medium (IGM) for which the dominant matter component was hydrogen gas. With no luminous sources present, these are known as the Dark Ages. Theoretical models predict that, over the next few hundred million years, gravity slowly condensed the gas into denser and denser regions, within which the first stars eventually appeared, marking Cosmic Dawn.
 
As more stars formed, and the first galaxies assembled, they flooded the universe with ultraviolet photons capable of ionizing hydrogen gas. A few hundred million years after Cosmic Dawn, the first stars produced enough ultraviolet photons to reionize essentially all the universe's hydrogen atoms. This Reionization era is the hallmark event of this early generation of galaxies, marking the phase transition of the IGM back to a nearly completely ionized state.
 
The beginning of structural complexity in the universe constituted a remarkable transformation, but one that we have not yet investigated observationally. By pushing even farther back than the Hubble Space Telescope can see, the truly first structures in the universe can be studied. Theoretical models suggest that existing measurements are beginning to probe the tail end of Reionization, but the first stars and galaxies, in the Dark Ages and the Cosmic Dawn, currently lie beyond our reach.
 
DARE will make the first measurements of the birth of the first stars and black holes and will measure the properties of the otherwise invisible stellar populations. Such observations are essential for placing existing measurements in a proper context, and to understand how the first galaxies grew from earlier generations of structures.

Mission
DARE's approach is to measure the spectral shape of the sky-averaged, redshifted  21-cm signal over a radio bandpass of 40–120 MHz, observing the redshift range 11–35, which correlates to 80–420 million years after the Big Bang. DARE orbits the Moon for 3 years and takes data above the lunar farside, the only location in the inner Solar System proven to be free of human-generated radio frequency interference and any significant ionosphere.

The science instrument is mounted to a RF quiet spacecraft bus and is composed of a three-element radiometer, including electrically-short, tapered, biconical dipole antennas, a receiver, and a digital spectrometer. The smooth frequency response of the antennas and the differential spectral calibration approach used for DARE are effective in removing the intense cosmic foregrounds so that the weak cosmic 21-cm signal can be detected.

Similar projects
Besides DARE, are other similar projects are proposed to also study this area such as the Precision Array for Probing the Epoch of Reionization (PAPER), Low Frequency Array (LOFAR), Murchison Widefield Array (MWA), Giant Metrewave Radio Telescope (GMRT), and the Large Aperture Experiment to Detect the Dark Ages (LEDA).

See also

Reionization
Wouthuysen–Field coupling

References

Further reading

External links
 JPL Helps Shoot for the Moon, Stars, Planets and More

Proposed NASA space probes
Cosmic background radiation
Big Bang
Physical cosmology